Church of St John of Beverley may refer to:
 St John of Beverley Church, Beverley
 Church of St John of Beverley, Scarrington
 Church of St John of Beverley, Whatton

See also 
 St. John's Church (disambiguation)